William Crawshay may refer to:

William Crawshay I (1764–1834), South Wales industrialist
William Crawshay II (1788–1867), son of William I, owner of Cyfarthfa Ironworks in Merthyr Tydfil
William Thompson Crawshay (1847–1918), grandson of William II, ironmaster